Adolphe Ferdinand Dupeuty (born in Paris, 1828 – died in L'Haÿ-les-Roses 13 March 1884) was a French journalist and playwright, the son of Charles Dupeuty.

A secretary of the Paris Opera from 1850 to 1852, a columnist from 1856 at Le Figaro, Figaro-programme, Le Charivari and at the Événement where he was responsible for the Theater courier section, his plays were presented on the most important Parisian stages of the 19th century: Théâtre des Folies-Dramatiques, Théâtre Marigny, Théâtre du Palais-Royal etc.

Works 
1843: Une campagne à deux, comedy in 1 act, with Ernest Jaime
1849: L'Hôtel de la Tête Noire, drama in 5 acts and 9 tableaux, with Eugène Cormon and Eugène Grangé, 1849
1853: Les canotiers de la Seine, vaudeville aquatique in 3 acts, with Henri Thiéry
1857: Fualdès, drama in five acts and eight tableaux, with Grangé
1857: Arsène et Camille, vaudeville in 1 act, mingled with couplets, with Henri Thiéry
1863: Un joli cocher, vaudeville in 1 act, with Thiéry
1864: Où est la femme ?, foreword by Jules Noriac, E. Dentu
1864: Le Carnaval des canotiers, vaudeville in 4 acts, with Charles Dupeuty, Amédée de Jallais and Thiéry
1864: En classe ! Mesdemoiselles, folie-vaudeville in 1 act, with de Jallais
1867: Le serment de bichette, vaudeville in 1 act, with Hippolyte Bedeau
1874: Blanche de Césanne, proverbe in 1 act

Bibliography 
 Louis Gustave Vapereau, Dictionnaire universel des contemporains, 1865, 
 Ferdinand Natanael Staaff, La littérature française depuis la formation de la langue jusqu'à nos jours, 1884,

External links 
 Photographie par Nadar sur Gallica

19th-century French journalists
French male journalists
19th-century French dramatists and playwrights
Writers from Paris
1828 births
1884 deaths
19th-century French male writers